Phomopsis perseae is a fungal plant pathogen affecting avocados.

External links
 Index Fungorum
 USDA ARS Fungal Database

Fungal tree pathogens and diseases
Avocado tree diseases
perseae